Gruppe or Gruppé  may refer to:
Gruppe, a military term, see Glossary of German military terms
Charles Paul Gruppé (1860–1940), an American painter
Emile Albert Gruppé (1896–1978), an American painter
 Otto Gruppe (1851–1921), German mythographer
Otto Friedrich Gruppe (1804–1876), German philosopher, scholar-poet and philologist

See also